Store Erte is a lake in the municipality of Halden in Østfold county, Norway.

See also
List of lakes in Norway

Halden
Lakes of Viken (county)